Against Me!, also known as The Acoustic EP, is the second widely distributed release by the punk band Against Me!. No tracks on the album contain any electric instruments or drums, only acoustic guitars and an acoustic bass. The original vinyl version, released November 2001, had four tracks, and two extra songs were included on the CD version released in February 2003. Electric versions of several songs appeared on the band's debut full-length Against Me! Is Reinventing Axl Rose.

This EP was never officially titled. The words "Acoustic EP" do not appear anywhere on the album or in the liner notes. In a manner similar to that of the Beatles's White Album, it is technically self-titled, but is nearly always referred to as The Acoustic EP, including on the band's official website.

Track listing

Personnel
 Laura Jane Grace – guitar, vocals, artwork
 Dustin Fridkin – bass, vocals, artwork
 Adam Volk – backing vocals
 Jordan Kleeman – backing vocals, artwork
 Rob McGregor – recording, mastering
 James Bowman – artwork
 Var Thelin – artwork

References

Against Me! EPs
2001 EPs
Punk rock EPs
Folk EPs
Albums produced by Rob McGregor